Peter Skelton (25 July 1934 – 1 August 2009) was a New Zealand cricketer. He played first-class cricket for Northern Districts and Otago between 1953 and 1958.

See also
 List of Otago representative cricketers

References

External links
 

1934 births
2009 deaths
New Zealand cricketers
Northern Districts cricketers
Otago cricketers
Cricketers from Whanganui